Figure skating has been contested at the Australian Youth Olympic Festival, an international multi-sport event organised by the Australian Olympic Committee

Medalists

Men

Ladies

References
 Australian Youth Olympic Festival 2007

External links
 Australian Olympic Committee

 
Youth Olympic Festival
Australian Youth Olympic Festival
Australian Youth Olympic Festival
Youth Olympic Festival